Jacob Dehn Andersen (born 4 August 1995) is a retired Danish professional footballer who played as a centre back. He is currently the assistant coach of Skive IK.

Club career

Randers

Dehn debuted for Randers FC at the age of 16 on 27 April 2012 against Viborg FF. He was also on a trial at Celtic earlier in his youth career. He signed a 3-year old professional contract and was promoted to the first team squad at the age of only 16.

Dehn was a very talented player and went on a trial at Wolverhampton Wanderers in March 2015, without earning any contract. He announced in June 2015, that he wouldn't continue at the club for the next season.

Vejle Boldklub

On 3 July 2015 it was confirmed, that Dehn had signed a 1.5-year contract with Vejle Boldklub. He played his first match for Vejle against FC Fredericia on 26 July 2015, which ended 1-1.

In July 2016, he was on a one-week trial at Falkenbergs FF, however, he didn't get any contract. Dehn wanted to start a new chapter in another club and Vejle announced in July 2016, that they had terminated his contract.

Viborg
After a successful trial at Viborg FF, he signed a two-year contract with the club on 18 July 2016.

Dehn failed to become a regular part of the squad in the first season, with only three league matches played.

Skive
On 31 January 2020, Dehn joined Danish 1st Division club Skive IK.

Retirement and coaching career
After 1,5 years at Skive IK, 25-year old Dehn announced his retirement on 28 May 2021 and revealed, that he would continue as an assistant coach for AGF's U-15 squad. On 18 July 2022, Dehn was hired as assistant coach of his former club Skive IK.

References

External links
 http://www.dbu.dk/landshold/landsholdsdatabasen/PlayerInfo/6888http://www.randersfc.dk/index.php?menu=47&side=spiller&spiller=141

Living people
1995 births
Danish men's footballers
Randers FC players
Vejle Boldklub players
Viborg FF players
Skive IK players
Danish Superliga players
Danish 1st Division players
People from Randers
Association football defenders
VSK Aarhus players
Denmark youth international footballers
Sportspeople from the Central Denmark Region